HD 42618 is a well-studied star with an exoplanetary companion in the equatorial constellation of Orion. With an apparent visual magnitude of 6.85 it is too faint to be readily visible to the naked eye. This system is located at a distance of 79.6 light years from the Sun based on parallax measurements.

The stellar classification of HD 42618 is G4V, which shows it to be an ordinary G-type main-sequence star. It is considered a close solar analog, which means the physical properties of the star are particularly similar to those of the Sun. Seismic model indicates the star is older and more evolved than the Sun with an age of about 5.5 billion years. It is spinning with a low projected rotational velocity of 1.8 km/s, with the rotation rate being consistent with the star's low activity level. The star has 92% of the mass of the Sun and 94% of the Sun's radius. The surface metallicity is lower than in the Sun, with the abundance patterns being consistent with a solar-type star. HD 42618 is radiating 92% of the luminosity of the Sun from its photosphere at an effective temperature of 5,765 K.

In 2016, the discovery of a candidate exoplanet companion orbiting HD 42618 was announced. Designated HD 42618 b, it was found using the radial velocity method which showed a periodicity of 149.6 days. A second signal with a period of 388 days was detected, but this is unconfirmed and may be false. A 4,850 day signal is likely the result of star's magnetic activity cycle.

References

Further reading

G-type main-sequence stars
Solar analogs
Planetary systems with one confirmed planet

Orion (constellation)
Durchmusterung objects
042618
029432